Phoenix Games was an American game company that produced role-playing games and game supplements.

History
Phoenix Games was a partnership between Dan Bress and Phil Edgren, and was a successor to the company Little Soldier Games, to which Bress and Edgren had both contributed before it was shut down. Ed Konstant of Little Soldier Games wrote a few products for Phoenix Games, including The Book of Fantasy Miniatures (1978) and the open-ended deduction game Elementary Watson (1978), whose printing was paid for by Gamescience in return for rights to the Little Soldier back catalog. Some transitional books between the companies, such as The Book of Shamans (1978) were published under the Little Soldier Games label, which was itself listed as a division of Phoenix Games.  Phoenix Games continued on with Little Soldier's general fantasy role-playing game publications, but they also did broader work in the RPG field than Little Soldier had, supplementing their generic fantasy supplements with generic science-fiction supplements.  Kerry Lloyd got his first book, a "generic fantasy" adventure called The Mines of Keridav (1979), published through Maryland game company Phoenix Games. Phoenix Games disappeared before the sequel, The Demon Pits of Caeldo, could be published, so Lloyd decided to start his own gaming company, Gamelords. Phoenix Games also published the fantasy role-playing game supplements The Book of Shamans by Ed Lipsett and The Book of Treasure by Phil Edgren in 1978, and the fantasy adventure The Lost Abbey of Calthonwey by R. Norman Carter in 1979.  Phoenix Games also published Ed Lipsett's series of science-fiction role-playing game supplements Spacefarer's Guide to Planets: Sector One (1978), Spacefarer's Guide to Planets: Sector Two (1979), Spacefarer's Guide to Alien Monsters (1979), and Spacefarer's Guide to Alien Races (1979). Lipsett's books led to his Star Quest (1983) game, Japan's first entirely original RPG.

The second edition of the role-playing game Bushido was published by Phoenix Games in 1980; Phoenix Games was also getting ready to publish Paul Hume and Bob Charrette's Aftermath! (1981), but as the company went defunct, Fantasy Games Unlimited reprinted Bushido in 1981, and stickered their logo over the Phoenix Games logo on the Aftermath! boxes.

Phoenix Games had a booth at GenCon XII in 1979 to sell their science fiction and fantasy RPG products as well as create interest in their upcoming game Streets of Stalingrad, with a columnist from Dragon stating  noting the game purported to be 12 separate games in one, "which would make the seemingly steep price much more reasonable". Dana Lombardy's Streets of Stalingrad by Phoenix Games won the 1980 Charles S. Roberts Award for Best Initial Release Wargame. In the February 1981 issue of Dragon, another columnist noted that Phoenix Games "invested a very great deal in its massive Dana Lombardy-John Hill design Streets of Stalingrad", sparking rumors that the company would go out of business. One of the publishers to whom freelance game designer Perry Moore sold, Phoenix Games of Rockville, Maryland, folded after its release of Streets of Stalingrad, and before any of Perry's designs for them could reach print.<ref>Dragon #49 (May 1981)</ref> Game reviewer Ian Chadwick called it "one of the most impressive games the industry has ever produced", noting that Streets of Stalingrad'' would quickly be gone from stores for good because the game suffered from low financing and the closing of "the short-lived Phoenix Games".

References

Role-playing game publishing companies